Robert William Kerber (June 11, 1913 – December 1, 1991) was an American competition swimmer who represented the United States at the 1932 Summer Olympics in Los Angeles, California.  Kerber finished sixth in the men's 100-meter backstroke, recording a time of 1:12.8 in the event final.

See also
 List of Northwestern University alumni

External links
  Robert Kerber – Olympic athlete profile at Sports-Reference.com

1913 births
1991 deaths
American male backstroke swimmers
Northwestern Wildcats men's swimmers
Olympic swimmers of the United States
Sportspeople from Park Ridge, Illinois
Swimmers at the 1932 Summer Olympics
20th-century American people